Aloe littoralis is a flowering plant in the Asphodelaceae family. It is a succulent native to arid regions in South Tropical Africa and Southern Africa.

See also
Succulent plants

References

littoralis
Flora of South Tropical Africa
Flora of Southern Africa
Taxa named by John Gilbert Baker